Michael J. Birmingham was an American politician from Maryland and a member of the Democratic Party. He served as the first Baltimore County Executive from 1956 to 1958.

References

Maryland Democrats
Baltimore County Executives
1964 deaths